Bø blad (The Bø Gazette) is a local Norwegian newspaper in the municipality of Bø in Telemark county. 

The newspaper was established in 1986 by Arne Kielland, a former Storting representative for the Labor Party and Socialist Left Party. The paper is published in Nynorsk and is issued 48 times a year. Among other things, Bø blad is known for its long headlines and the humorous column "Lensmannsrunden" (The Lensmann's Round).

Editors
Arne Kielland (1986–2003)
Tone Anne Ødegård (2003–2006)
Hilde Eika Nesje (November 2006–)

Circulation
According to the Norwegian Audit Bureau of Circulations and the National Association of Local Newspapers, Bø blad has had the following annual circulation:
2006: 2,371
2007: 2,355
2008: 2,367
2009: 2,355
2010: 2,325
2011: 2,257
2012: 2,359
2013: 2,501
2014: 2,622
2015: 2,542
2016: 2,567

References

External links
Bø blad home page

Weekly newspapers published in Norway
Norwegian-language newspapers
Mass media in Telemark
Bø, Telemark
Newspapers established in 1986
1986 establishments in Norway
Nynorsk